Theo Schurte (born 31 May 1940) is a Liechtenstein sports shooter. He competed in the men's 50 metre rifle, prone event at the 1984 Summer Olympics.

References

1940 births
Living people
Liechtenstein male sport shooters
Olympic shooters of Liechtenstein
Shooters at the 1984 Summer Olympics
Place of birth missing (living people)